Richard T. Morrison (born June 10, 1967) is a judge of the United States Tax Court.

Born in Kansas, Morrison received a Bachelor of Arts and a Bachelor of Science from the University of Kansas in 1989 and was a visiting student at Mansfield College, Oxford University from 1987 to 1988. He received a Juris Doctor from the University of Chicago Law School, 1993 and a Master of Arts from the University of Chicago in 1994. He was a law clerk to Judge Jerry Edwin Smith, United States Court of Appeals for the Fifth Circuit from 1993 to 1994, and was then an associate with Baker & McKenzie in Chicago until 1996, and with Mayer Brown & Platt, also in Chicago, until 2001.

Morrison then entered government service, working as a Deputy Assistant Attorney General for Review and Appellate Matters in the Tax Division of the United States Department of Justice, from September 2001 to August 2008 (except for term as Acting Assistant Attorney General, from July 2007 to January 2008). Nominated by President George W. Bush as Judge, United States Tax Court, on November 15, 2007, Morrison was confirmed by Senate, July 7, 2008. Following confirmation he was then appointed by President George W. Bush as a Judge of United States Tax Court, on August 28, 2008, for a term ending August 27, 2023.

References

Attribution
Material on this page was copied from the website of the United States Tax Court, which is published by a United States government agency, and is therefore in the public domain.

1967 births
Living people
21st-century American judges
Judges of the United States Tax Court
People associated with Baker McKenzie
People from Hutchinson, Kansas
United States Article I federal judges appointed by George W. Bush
University of Chicago alumni
University of Chicago Law School alumni
University of Kansas alumni
People associated with Mayer Brown